Francesco Queirolo (1704–1762) was an Italian Genoese-born sculptor, active in Rome and Naples during the Rococo period.

Biography
He trained together with Giuseppe Rusconi in Rome. Here he executed the statues of St. Charles Borromeo and St. Bernard in the façade of Santa Maria Maggiore, a bust of Christine of Sweden (1740), the statue of Wealth  in the Trevi Fountain (1735) and the sepulchre of Duchess Grillo in Sant'Andrea delle Fratte (1752).

After 1752 he was active in the decoration of the famed Neapolitan Cappella Sansevero.

Release from Deception (Il Disinganno)

Release from Deception (Il Disinganno), produced in 1752–1759, shows a fisherman being released from a net by an angel. The masterpiece was carved from a single piece of marble and can be seen in Cappella Sansevero, Naples.

The inscription on the book at the bottom of the sculpture depicts in Latin the words of the angel to the fisherman, made up of three different quotations from the Vulgate Holy Bible put together:

VINCULA TUA DISRUMPAM (Nahum i. 13)

VINCULA TENEBRARUM ET LONGÆ NOCTIS (QUIBUS ES) COMPEDITUS (Sapientiæ xvii. 2)

UT NON CUM HOC MUNDO DAMNEBIS (St. Paul 1 Corinthians. xi. 32)

“I will burst thy bonds asunder, / being fettered with the bonds of darkness, and a long night, / that you will not be condemned with this world.”

References

External links

1704 births
1762 deaths
18th-century Genoese people
18th-century Italian sculptors
Italian male sculptors
Rococo sculptors
18th-century Italian male artists